Miss Vietnam World (Vietnamese: Hoa hậu Thế giới người Việt) is a beauty contest for both Vietnamese women in Vietnam and Overseas Vietnamese women from other countries in the world. The pageant is related to Miss World Vietnam but not to the Miss Vietnam pageants. The contest was first held in 2007, and the next was held in August 2010.

Titleholders 

See also: Danh sách đại diện của Việt Nam tại các cuộc thi sắc đẹp lớn

Journey
Color keys

Miss Vietnam World 2007 
Miss Vietnam World  2007 took place in Vinpearl, Nha Trang on September 2, the Independence day of Vietnam. There were 37 contestants participating in this contest from many countries in the world, including Vietnam, United Kingdom, Switzerland, Germany, Czech Republic, Russia, Ukraine, Bulgaria, Canada and the United States. The final consisted of 4 sections: evening gown, swimsuit, áo dài (the traditional costume of Vietnamese women) and an interview.

Placement

Special Awards 
 Miss Tourism :  Nguyen Kang Wung Ching - Germany
 Miss Photogenic :  Nguyen Cao Thu Van - USA
 Best in Evening Gown :  Tran Ngoc Bich - Ho Chi Minh City
 Best in Presentation :  Nguyen Thi Anh Ly - Ha Noi
 Best Complexion :  Vu Ngoc Anh - Ha Noi
 Miss Beach :  Nguyen Thi Van Anh - Ukraine
 Best in Ao dai :  Anna Hua Ngoc Anh - Great Britain
 Best in Interview :  Ngo Phuong Lan - Switzerland

Miss Vietnamese World 2009 
The second edition of this beauty pageant planned to be held in 2009. It was allowed but then was cancelled due to lack of time for well organising.

Miss Vietnamese World 2010 
Miss Vietnam World 2010 final took place in Vinpearl Land, Nha Trang from May 20 to August 30. Before that the semi-final with contestants living in Vietnam competed in Ho Chi Minh City and Hanoi, for contestants from in the American region competed in the US, and those from Europe gathered in the UK. Russia host competitors from former Soviet Union countries and South Korea was home for to competitors from Asian countries.

There are some contestants participating in this contest from many countries in the world, including Vietnam, Australia, Belgium, Czech Republic, Germany, Japan, Russia, Sweden, United States. The winner of Miss World Vietnam 2010 - Lưu Thị Diễm Hương - received gifts worth 500 million dong (US$26,500), the highest among beauty contests in Vietnam so far and she represented Vietnam to compete at Miss Earth 2010, which was held in Nha Trang later that year.

Il Divo and several other local stars performed at 2010 Miss World Vietnam.

Placement

Special Awards 
Miss Congeniality:  - Ngụy Thanh Lan
Miss Photogenic:  - Lưu Thị Diễm Hương
Best Face:  - Daniela Nguyễn Thu Mây
Miss Elegant:  - Nguyễn Mai Anh
Miss Sport:  - Phạm Thúy Vy Victoria
Miss Talent:  - Nguyễn Thanh Huyền
Best in Áo dài:  - Hạ Thị Hoàng Anh (previously Phạm Thị Thùy Linh but was disqualified because of violating the regulation)
Miss Fashion:  - Ninh Hoàng Ngân
Miss Beach:  - Nguyễn Ngọc Kiều Khanh

Notes 
Miss Vietnam World 2007 had the right to represent Vietnam in Miss World 2007 and Miss World 2008, but she declined. Đặng Minh Thu, the 2nd Runner-up, was chosen to replace instead. Thu failed to make the final Top 15 and the crown going to Miss China. In 2008, Dương Trương Thiên Lý, the 2nd Runner-up of Miss Universe Vietnam 2008 also failed to make the semi-finalists.
In 2010, Miss Vietnam World and Miss Vietnam were held at almost the same time. The winner of Miss Vietnam World, Lưu Thị Diễm Hương, was the Vietnamese representative to Miss Earth 2010 and enter Top 14 while 1st Runner-up Nguyễn Ngọc Kiều Khanh failed to make the cut at Miss World 2010
In 2011, Daniela Nguyễn Thu Mây (top 15 Miss Vietnam World 2010) was invited to join Miss Supranational 2011 in Poland and she got 3rd runner-up title of the competition while Miss Poland was the winner in her homeland. Besides, 2nd Runner-up Phạm Thúy Vy Victoria represented Vietnam to compete Miss World 2011 in Great Britain in November. Also, Top 5 Miss Vietnam World 2010 - Phan Thị Mơ entered top 10 in 23rd Miss Asia USA, which is held in California, United States and represented Vietnam in Miss Earth 2011 held in Quezon, Philippines. Later, she crowned World Miss Tourism Ambassador 2018.
In 2012, Lưu Thị Diễm Hương represented Vietnam again at Miss Universe 2012.

See also

 Miss Vietnam
 Miss Universe Vietnam
 Miss World Vietnam
 Mister Vietnam
 Miss Supranational Vietnam
 Miss Earth Vietnam
 Vietnam at major beauty pageants

References

External links 

 Miss Vietnam World Official Website

Beauty pageants in Vietnam
Recurring events established in 2007
Women in Vietnam
2007 establishments in Vietnam
Vietnamese awards